Stillwell Saunooke (September 1, 1891 - ?) was a professional football player who played in the National Football League during the 1922 season. That season, he joined the NFL's Oorang Indians. The Indians were a team based in LaRue, Ohio, composed only of Native Americans, and coached by Jim Thorpe. Saunooke attend and played college football at the Carlisle Indian School located in Carlisle, Pennsylvania and was Cherokee.

References

Uniform Numbers of the NFL

Notes

1891 births
Carlisle Indians football players
Native American players of American football
Oorang Indians players
Players of American football from North Carolina
Eastern Band Cherokee people

Year of death missing